Arthur Clifton Guyton (September 8, 1919 – April 3, 2003) was an American physiologist.

Guyton is well known for his Textbook of Medical Physiology, which quickly became the standard text on the subject in medical schools. The first edition was published in 1956, the 10th edition in 2000 (the last before Guyton's death), and the 12th edition in 2010. The 14th edition (2020) is the latest version available. It is the world's best-selling medical physiology textbook and has been translated into at least 15 languages.

Textbook of medical physiology
Textbook of Medical Physiology is one of the world's best-selling physiology books and has been translated into at least 13 languages (the textbook memoriam states 13, but the online memoriam states at least 15.)

From the ninth edition onwards, John E. Hall co-authored the textbook. However, all prior editions were written entirely by Guyton, with the eighth edition published in 1991. Subsequent editions, including the latest, preserve his legacy within the title, Guyton and Hall Textbook of Medical Physiology.

Physiology of cardiac output
Guyton is most famous for his experiments in the 1950s which studied the physiology of cardiac output and its relationship with the peripheral circulation (see e.g. chapter 23 of Guyton 1976 edition, or chapter 20 of both Guyton 1991 and Guyton & Hall 2006 edition)

It was this work which overturned the conventional wisdom that it was the heart itself that controlled cardiac output. Guyton instead demonstrated that it was the need of the body tissues for oxygen which was the true regulator of cardiac output. The "Guyton Curves" which describe the relationship between right atrial pressure and cardiac output form the basis for understanding the physiology of circulation. This subject is well described in Guyton's textbook (e.g. Guyton 1976; Guyton 1991; Guyton & Hall 2006) which contains references to the original publications.

Biography
Arthur Guyton was born in Oxford, Mississippi, to Dr. Billy S. Guyton, a highly respected eye, ear, nose, and throat specialist, and Kate Smallwood Guyton, a mathematics and physics teacher who had been a missionary in China before marriage.

Guyton initially intended to be a cardiovascular surgeon but was partially paralysed after being infected with polio. He suffered from this infection in 1946 during his final year of residency training. Suffering paralysis in his right leg, left arm, and both shoulders, he spent nine months in Warm Springs, Georgia, recuperating
and applying his inventive mind to building the first motorized wheelchair
controlled by a "joy stick", a motorized hoist for lifting patients, special leg
braces, and other devices to aid the handicapped. For those inventions, he
received a Presidential Citation.

Despite his disability, he was father to 10 children who all went on to become celebrated physicians, including a professor of ophthalmology, a professor of surgery, a professor of medicine, a cardiothoracic surgeon, a rheumatologist, two anaesthesiologists and two orthopaedic surgeons.  Eight of his children attended Harvard Medical School, one attended Duke University School of Medicine, and one attended the University of Miami's medical school after obtaining a PhD from Harvard.

Due to his disability, he had to abandon his plan to become a surgeon. Instead he concentrated on physiology research and teaching, and became the head of the University of Mississippi Dept. of Physiology and Biophysics. He retired as department chair in 1989 but continued as emeritus professor up until his death on April 3, 2003, in a car accident, less than one month after his first great-grandchild was born.

Obituary
Guyton's obituary states "unlike most major textbooks, which often have as many as 10-20 authors", the first eight editions "were written entirely by Guyton with a new edition always arriving on schedule for nearly 40 years. This feat is unprecedented for any physiology or medical text. His textbook is unique in the history of medical publishing".

His obituary notes that he triumphed over polio:
He had a special ability to inspire people through his indomitable spirit", and "his courage in the face of adversity humbled us. He would not succumb to the crippling effects of polio. It is very unlikely that a repairman ever crossed his doorstep, except perhaps for a social visit. He and his children not only built their home, but also repaired each and every malfunctioning appliance and home device no matter the difficulty or the physical challenge. He built a hoist to lower himself into the "hole" beneath their house to repair the furnace and septic lines when calling a repairman seemed to be the only option to those who did not know him well. On trips to meetings, he walked long distances across airport terminals when using a wheelchair would have been much easier. His struggle to rise from his chair and walk to the podium for a lecture was moving, but the audience was always more impressed when he forcefully articulated his brilliant concepts.

His obituary in The Physiologist journal, and Memoriam in the 11th edition of his book, are largely verbatim of each other, including as below: 
Arthur Guyton's research contributions, which include more than 600 papers and 40 books, are legendary and place him among the greatest figures in the history of cardiovascular physiology. His research covered virtually all areas of cardiovascular regulation and led to many seminal concepts that are now an integral part of the understanding of cardiovascular disorders such as hypertension, heart failure, and edema. It is difficult to discuss cardiovascular regulation without including his concepts of cardiac output and venous return, negative interstitial fluid pressure and regulation of tissue fluid volume and edema, regulation of tissue blood flow and whole body blood flow auto-regulation, renal-pressure natriuresis, and long-term blood pressure regulation.Guyton, Arthur C., & Hall, John E (2006)  p.vii 
The Textbook Memoriam continues: "Indeed, his concepts of cardiovascular regulation are found in virtually every major textbook of physiology. They have become so familiar that their origin is sometimes forgotten".

Notes

References
Reference to Guyton's biographical details in the above text comes primarily from the obituary published in Physiologist magazine, and John E. Hall's memoriam and preface to the 11th edition of Textbook of Medical Physiology both of which contain overlapping statements, sometimes verbatim, sometimes almost verbatim.

Further reading
 The pioneering use of systems analysis to study cardiac output regulation, John E. Hall
 Brinson C, Quinn J. Arthur C. Guyton—His Life, His Family, His Achievements. Jackson, MS, Hederman Brothers Press, 1989.
 Bode R. "A Doctor Who's Dad to Seven Doctors—So Far!" Reader's Digest, December, 1982, pp. 141–145.

1919 births
2003 deaths
University of Mississippi faculty
American physiologists
Road incident deaths in Mississippi
University of Mississippi alumni
Harvard Medical School alumni